The Napa Sentinel (often referred to as the Napa Valley Sentinel) was a weekly newspaper published in Napa, California. Harry V. Martin, who served 12 years on the Napa city council, was its editor and publisher for 25 years.

References

Napa County, California
History of Napa County, California
Newspapers published in the San Francisco Bay Area
Defunct newspapers published in California
Weekly newspapers published in California